Gaspar Dias (died 1671), a Portuguese painter, studied at Rome under Raphael and Michelangelo, and on his return home devoted himself to the production of church pictures. He died at Lisbon.

References
 

Year of birth unknown
1671 deaths
Portuguese painters
Portuguese male painters
17th-century Portuguese people
17th-century Portuguese artists